Subject: I Love You is a 2011 American drama romance film based on the "I Love You" computer virus of 2000. The film stars Jericho Rosales and Briana Evigan.

Plot
Inspired by the "I love u" computer virus, the film tells the story of a young man, Victor, who will do anything to reconnect with Butterfly, the only woman he has ever loved- even if it means entangling himself in an international criminal investigation.

Cast
 Briana Evigan as Butterfly
 Jericho Rosales as Victor
 Dean Cain as James Trapp
 Dante Basco as Nicky
 Kristin Bauer as Sarah Drake
 Lauren Bittner as Renna
 Gary Valenciano as Choy
 Apl.de.Ap as Calessa Driver
 Andrew Leeds as Chris
 Luisse Belle Pressman as Lucy
 Tirso Cruz III as Frankie
 Munda Razooki as Goon
 Ermie Concepcion as Adela
 Joel Torre as Marlon

References

External links
 

2011 romantic drama films
2011 films
American romantic drama films
Films shot in Metro Manila
Films set in Metro Manila
Films about interracial romance
Films shot in the Philippines
2010s American films